Dioxide Materials was founded in 2009 in Champaign, Illinois, and is now headquartered in Boca Raton, Florida.   Its main business is to develop technology to lower the world's carbon footprint.  Dioxide Materials is developing technology to convert carbon dioxide, water and renewable energy into carbon-neutral gasoline (petrol) or jet fuel. Applications include CO2 recycling, sustainable fuels production  and reducing curtailment of renewable energy(i.e. renewable energy that could not be used by the grid).

Carbon Dioxide Electrolyzer Technology 
Carbon Dioxide electrolyzers are a major part of Dioxide Materials' business. The work started in response to a Department of Energy  challenge to find better catalysts for electrochemical reduction of carbon dioxide.  At the time the overpotential (i.e. wasted voltage) was too high, and the rate too low for practical applications.  Workers at Dioxide Materials theorized that a bifunctional catalyst consisting of a metal and an ionic liquid might lower the overpotential for electrochemical reduction of carbon dioxide.  Indeed, it was found that the combination of two catalysts, silver nanoparticles and an ionic liquid solution containing equal volumes of 1-ethyl-3-methylimidazolium tetrafluoroborate (EMIM-BF4) and water, reduced the overpotential for CO2 conversion to carbon monoxide (CO) from about 1 volt to only 0.17 volts.  Workers from other laboratories have subsequently reproduced the findings on many metals, and with several ionic liquids. Dioxide Materials has shown that a similar enhancement occurs during alkaline water electrolysis and the hydrocarboxylation  of acetylene  ("Reppe chemistry").

At this point, there is still some question about how the imidazolium is able to lower the overpotential for the electrochemical reduction of carbon dioxide.  The first step in the electrolysis of CO2 is the addition of an electron into the CO2 or a molecular complex containing CO2.  The resultant species is labeled "CO2¯" in the figure on the left.  It requires at least an electron-volt of energy per molecule to form the species in the absence of the ionic liquid. That electron-volt of energy is largely wasted during the reaction.  Rosen at al postulated that a new complex forms in presence of the ionic liquid so that 1 eV of energy is not wasted.  The complex allows the reaction to follow the green pathway on the figure on the right. Recent work suggests that the new complex is a zwitterion  Other possible pathways (i.e. non-zwitterions) are discussed in Keith et al. Rosen at al. Verdaguer-Casadevall et al. and Shi et al.

Sustainion Membranes 
Unfortunately, ionic liquids were found to be too corrosive to be used in practical carbon dioxide electrolyzers.  Ionic liquids are strong solvents. They dissolve/corrode the seals, carbon electrodes and other parts in commercial electrolyzers.  As a result, they were difficult to be used in practice.  
In order to avoid the corrosion, Dioxide Materials switched from ionic liquid catalysts to catalytic anion exchange polymers. A number of polymers were tested and the imidazolium functionalized styrene polymer shown in the figure on the right showed the best performance.  The membranes were tradenamed Sustainion. The use of Sustainion membranes raised the current and lifetime of the CO2 electrolyzer into the commercially useful range. Sustainion membranes have shown conductivities above 100 mS/cm under alkaline conditions at 60 °C, stability for thousands of hours in 1M KOH, and offer a physical mechanical stability that is useful for many different applications. The membranes showed a lifetime over 3000 hours in CO2 electrolyzers at high current densities.

References 

Electrochemical engineering 
Chemical companies of the United States 
Companies based in Boca Raton, Florida
Carbon dioxide
Climate change